Lezhë is a city in the Republic of Albania and seat of Lezhë County and Lezhë Municipality.

One of the main strongholds of the Labeatai, the earliest of the fortification walls of Lezhë are of typical Illyrian construction and are dated to the late 4th century BC. Lezhë was one of the main centres of the Illyrian kingdom. During the conflicts with Macedon, it was captured by Philip V becoming the Macedonian outlet to the Adriatic Sea. The city was later recovered by the Illyrians. It was subjected to Rome after the Roman-Illyrian wars and the fall of Gentius' realm. Lezhë was the site of the League of Lezhë where Skanderbeg united the Albanian lords in the fight against the Ottoman Empire.

Name 

The city is mentioned in ancient sources as Lissós (Ancient Greek: Λισσός) and Lissus (Latin: Lissus, Lissum). It is also attested in numismatic material. The ethnicon ΛΙΣΣΙΤΑΝ /LISSITAN/ is found on coin inscriptions of the Hellenistic era. It is considered a Greek toponym, deriving from the Greek λισσός /lissós/, meaning 'smooth, smooth rock, gruff'.

The ancient name Lissus evolved into its modern form Lezhë (archaic: Lesh) through Albanian sound changes. In Turkish, the town is known as Leş or Eşim and in Italian as Alessio. Lezhë is also known as Alise, Alexiensis, Eschenderari, or Mrtav.

History

Early history 

From the early Mycenaean period (1600-1450 BC) a free exchange pattern is confirmed with the centres of Mycenaean Greece as seen by various swords (C and D type) unearthed in Lezhë. The earliest human constructions have an Illyrian character and appear on the site from the Late Bronze Age and Early Iron Age. The settlement with its fortifications was built on a 413-metre-high mountain, the Mal i Shëlbuemit, from at least the 8th century BC, and was located near the mouth of the Drin river.

Diodorus ("Library", 15.1,  1st century BC) mentions that Dionysius of Syracuse founded a "city called Lissos" in the year 385 BC, as part of a strategy by Dionysius to secure Syracusan trade routes along the Adriatic. Diodorus calls it a polis. It has been suggested that the Syracusan colony mentioned by Diodorus was in fact more likely established at Issa near the island of Pharos, not at Lissus (modern Lezhë) which was too distant for the events described by the ancient historian. Meanwhile, Issa is known from other evidence to be a Syracusan foundation. Pierre Cabanes notes that there is nothing to connect Lissos with Syracuse except Diodorus' account, and even if Diodorus' account is accepted as accurate, it is very likely that this colony had a short life.

The earliest of the fortification walls of the proto-urban settlement are of typical Illyrian construction and are dated to the late 4th century BC. The transition from the Iron Age fortification of Acrolissus (on the 413 m Shëlbuem mountain) to the proper Illyrian city of Lissus was continuous. The city was built on a lower hill (172 m) near the Iron Age fortification. It was surrounded by ramparts that faced the low valley of the Drin river and the sea coast. Its function was to guard the route inland, to ensure defense against possible attacks from the sea, and to furnish a secure anchorage for the Illyrian ships.
 
By the 3rd century BC, Lissus was one of the main cities of the Illyrian kingdom under the Ardiaean and Labeatan dynasties. In the 228 BC peace treaty with Rome, the Illyrian queen Teuta promised not to sail south of Lissus at the mouth of the Drin river with more than two lembi (Illyrian light ships), even those had to be unarmed. But when Rome was engaged in a war against the Celtic peoples of the Po Valley in northern Italy about the years 225–222 BC, Illyrian commander Demetrius detached the Atintani tribe from their alliance with Rome. Moreover, he sailed south of Lissus and engaged in piracy in violation of the 228 BC peace treaty. In the summer of 221 BC, tensions in Greece increased as Macedonia allied with the Achaean League against the Aetolian League, and the Illyrians attacked in their typical manner. Demetrius and Scerdilaidas sailed with 90 lembi south of Lissus. When they failed an assault on Pylos (western Peloponnese), they separated their fleets and Scerdilaidas returned north with 40 ships, while Demetrius plundered the Cyclades with 50 ships.

In Roman times Lissus was located in a territory inhabited by the Labeatae, however ancient sources never relate it with this tribe. Taking in account archaeological and historical considerations, the city of Lissus should have been founded in a Labeatan context, but perhaps by the time of Teuta's fall in the end of the 3rd century BC, on a Greek model it was organized as a polis turning away from its ethnic context. The dissociation from the ethnic to the polis coincided with Philip V of Macedon's conquest of a number of cities in Illyria. In 211 BC, Philip V captured Acrolissus, the citadel of Lissus, and Lissos surrendered to him, becoming the Macedonian outlet to the Adriatic Sea. The town was later recovered by the Illyrians. It was in Lissus that Perseus of Macedon negotiated an alliance against Rome with the Illyrian king Gentius, and it was from Lissus that Gentius organized his army against the Romans. Lissus maintained a large degree of municipal autonomy under both Macedonian and Illyrian rule, as evidenced by the coins minted there. During the reign of Gentius in the first half of the 2nd century BC, Lissus minted coins for the Illyrian ruler. The city was of some importance in the Roman Civil War, being taken by Marc Antony  and then remaining loyal to Caesar. In Roman times, the city was part of the province of Epirus Nova,

Middle ages 

During the reign of Justinian I (527-565) the local fortress was possibly mentioned as Alistion in the Synecdemus of Hierocles. At early 590s Lissus was captured by Slavic populations. Byzantine control was re-established during the early 9th century.

Albanian lord Vladislav Jonima of the Jonima family was acknowledged by the Pope as a ruler of a territory around Lezhë in 1319. He had the title of Count of Dioclea and of the seaside Albania. At the end of the 14th century, Albanian lord Dhimitër Jonima was lord of a territory between Mat and Lezhë.

In the Middle Ages, Lezha (known in Italian as Alessio) frequently changed masters until the Venetians took possession of it in 1386. It still belonged to them when Skanderbeg died, but In 1478 it fell into the hands of Turks during the siege of Shkodra, except for a short period (1501–1506) when it returned to Venetian domination. Because it was under the Venetian control, it was chosen in 1444 by Gjergj Kastrioti Skanderbeg as a neutral place for the convention of Albanian nobles and lords of the area aiming at organizing their common defence against the Turks.

Lezha was the site of the League of Lezhë where Skanderbeg united the Albanian princes in the fight against the Ottoman Empire.

Skanderbeg was buried in the cathedral of Lezhë which was dedicated to Saint Nicholas and later used as Selimie Mosque.

Contemporary 

Today Lezhë is a growing city. Its proximity to the port of Shëngjin as well as its location on the national road between the Montenegrin border to the North and Tirana to the South makes it an attractive location for industry and business.

Majority of the people from Lezhë descend from the Zadrima, Mirdita and Malësia/Malësi e madhe regions of northwestern Albania. The people from Zadrima and Mirdita are native to Lezhë and the surrounding area. The Malësor clans from Malësia, such as Kelmendi, Shkreli, and Kastrati had settled Lezhë and surrounding areas around 100–300 years ago. In terms of religion, Lezha has a Catholic majority (70-80%) and a Muslim minority (30-20%).

Geography 

Lezhë Municipality lies within Lezhë County as part of the Northern Region of Albania and consists of the adjacent administrative units of Balldren, Blinisht, Dajç, Kallmet, Kolsh, Shëngjin, Shënkoll, Ungrej, Zejmen with Lezhë constituting the municipal seat. The municipality spans between the Plain of Zadrima in the north, the Pukë-Mirditë Highlands in the east, the mouth of the Mat River in the south and the Albanian Adriatic Sea Coast in the west. It covers 509.1 km2.

Climate 

Infrastructure 

There are urban buses throughout the city and international and national buses. Lezhe has a train station not far from the center. The line starts in Durrës and ends in Shkodër. It is functional but not frequently.

The main highway in Lezhe is SH 1, connecting it with Shkodër to the north and the Durrës-Kukës Highway (A1, intersection at Milot) to the south. The SH32 connects Lezhe with Shëngjin on the coast.

Demography 

The population of the municipality of Lezhë at the 2011 census was 65,633, of which 15,510 in the city proper.

Culture 

The association football club is KS Besëlidhja Lezhë.
Although primarily concerned with football, KS Besëlidhja also participates in sports such as wrestling and beach volleyball.

From 2004 an excavation started around the ancient Acropolis of Lissos and the Skanderbeg Memorial, which revealed Hellenistic, Roman and Early Byzantine buildings, tombs and other findings.

Notable people 
Antonio Bruti, 16th century merchant and diplomat
Anton Kryezezi, Bishop of Lezhë
Lekë Dukagjini, prince
Jonima (Gjoni) family noble family
Gjergj Fishta, Catholic priest and poet
Ndoc Gjetja, poet
Henri Ndreka, soccer player, capped with Albania
Robert Grizha, soccer player
Erjon Dushku, soccer player
Renato Malota, soccer player
Ornel Gega, rugby union player
Tosol Bardhi, 16th century Albanian Catholic Priest.

See also 
 List of settlements in Illyria
 List of mayors of Lezhë

Notes

References

Bibliography

External links 

lezha.gov.alOfficial Website 

 
Cities in Albania
Municipalities in Lezhë County
Administrative units of Lezhë
Illyrian Albania
Cities in ancient Illyria
Archaeology of Illyria
Ancient Greek archaeological sites in Albania
Hellenistic Albania
Towns in Albania
Populated places established in the 4th century BC